Langholm Capital is a London-based private equity firm. 

Langholm Capital was founded in 2002, and is based at 2nd Floor, 17 Waterloo Place, London.

Their investments have included Bart Spices, Dorset Cereals, Lumene, and Tyrrells. In July 2013, Langholm sold Tyrells to Investcorp for £100 million.

The partners are Bert Wiegman, who founded the company, and Alistair Bird.

References

External links

Financial services companies established in 2002
Financial services companies based in London
Private equity firms of the United Kingdom
Companies based in the City of Westminster